Thomas Clarkson Scaffe  (April 19, 1896 – September 26, 1970) was an American college football player and coach. He served as the head football coach at St. John's College in Annapolis, Maryland from 1925 to 1926 and Wofford College in Spartanburg, South Carolina from 1927 to 1933.

Head coaching record

References

External links
 

1896 births
1970 deaths
American football guards
Navy Midshipmen football players
Navy Midshipmen football coaches
St. John's Johnnies football coaches
Wofford Terriers athletic directors
Wofford Terriers football coaches
Players of American football from Columbia, South Carolina
Burials at Arlington National Cemetery